Mordechai (Motti) Mizrachi (born 1946) is an Israeli multimedia artist who creates politically engaged conceptual works that combine sculpture, video, photography, public art and performance.  Dough, Via Dolorosa (1973) and Healing (1980) marked the emergence of avant-garde Israeli performance and video art. Since the 1980s, he has created numerous site specific public sculptures.

Biography
Disabled since childhood, Motti Mizrachi uses humor and self-irony in his work, with an emphasis on the flaws and pleasures of the human body, while examining the oppression and control of the strong over the weak, both socially and politically. In 1969-1973, he studied at Bezalel Academy of Arts and Design in Jerusalem.  He was represented in the 1980 Biennale de Paris, the 1987 and 1981 São Paulo Art Biennials, the 1988 Venice Biennale, and the 2003 Valencia Biennale. 

Mizrachi lives in Tel Aviv, Israel.

Teaching
 1980-1987 Bezalel, Jerusalem
 College of Art, School of Art Teachers, Ramat Hasharon
 Camera Obscura, Tel Aviv

Awards and recognition
 1976 - Beatrice S. Kolliner Award for a Young Israeli Artist, Israel Museum, Jerusalem
 1987 - Israeli Artist Award, Tel Aviv Museum and Bank Discount
 1987 - Sandberg Prize for Israeli Art, Israel Museum, Jerusalem
 1987 - Award, America-Israel Cultural Foundation
 1997 - Prize to encourage creativity, Ministry of Education and Culture
 2001 - Dan Sandel and Sandel Family Foundation Sculpture Award, Shoe Sculpture, Tel Aviv Museum of Art
 2002 - Award, Israel Ministry of Science, Culture and Sport

Public Art

See also
Visual arts in Israel

References

Further reading
 Agassi, Meir, Zadok Ben David, Motti Mizrachi. The Israeli Pavilion, The Venice Biennale 1988, Venice, 1988.
 Haifa Museums, Motti Mizrachi-Rwanda Casanova, Haifa Museums, 2000, .
 The Israel Museum, Jerusalem
 curator: Lorand Hegyi, Makom: zeitgenössische Kunst aus Israel, Wien, Museum Moderner Kunst Stiftung Ludwig Wien, 1993, .
 The Absent Body'', Body Imagery Between Judaism and Christianity in the work of eight Israeli artists, Beit Hatfutsot, 2012, .
 Biennale di Valencia, 2003, Curator: Lorand Hegyi.
 "The Giving Person" group show, 2005, Napoli , Curator:Lorand Hegyi,( ).
 "Domicile - Private/Public", 2005, Saint-Etienne, Curator: Lorand Hegyi, 2005,.
 "Micro-Narratives", Saint-Etienne and later in Belgrade, 2008 ,Curator:Lorand Hegyi,().
 "Essential Experiences" 2009, Museum Palazzo Riso, Palermo, Curator: Lorand Hegyi, Catalogue: Essential Experiences Electa Editore, 2009, (), together with Jan Fabre, Marina Abramovic, Richard Nonas, Dennis Oppenheim, Günther Uecker, Michelangelo Pistoletto, Lee Fan, Orlan, Gloria Friedmann.

External links
MottiMizrachi.com Official website. Retrieved March 2012
Motti Mizrachi YouTube channel. Retrieved March 2012
Motti Mizrachi at the Information Center for Israeli Art. Israel Museum. Retrieved March 2012.
 
 http://www.algemeiner.com/2015/10/02/whats-that-huge-white-bridal-dress-floating-over-the-tower-of-david/.. Retrieved November 2015.

Jewish sculptors
Israeli sculptors
Multimedia artists
Bezalel Academy of Arts and Design alumni
Living people
1946 births
Sandberg Prize recipients
Israeli contemporary artists
Israeli installation artists